Hucker is an English and German surname. Notable people with the surname include:

Charles Hucker (1919–1994), American historian
Ernie Hucker (1887–1970), Australian rugby league player
George J. Hucker (1893–1988), American microbiologist
Peter Hucker (born 1959), English footballer
Reinhold Hucker (born 1948), German sport wrestler
Tom Hucker (born 1967), American politician

English-language surnames
German-language surnames